Brian and Dann Battistone were the defending champions, but did not compete this year.
Lester Cook and David Martin defeated Santiago González and Travis Rettenmaier 4–6, 6–3, [10–5] in the final.

Seeds

Draw

Draw

References
 Doubles Draw
 Qualifying Doubles Draw

Natomas Men's Professional Tennis Tournament - Doubles
2009 Doubles